Page High School can refer to:

Fred J. Page High School in Franklin, Tennessee
Page High School (Page, Arizona) in Page, Arizona
Walter Hines Page Senior High School in Greensboro, North Carolina